The Syndicate is a British television drama.

The Syndicate may also refer to:

Books
 The Syndicate (play), by Eduardo de Filippo
 The Syndicate, 1881 book by Charles Nordhoff 
 The Syndicate, 1960 novel by Denys Rhodes
 The Syndicate, 2003 novel by Jon F. Merz

Film and television
 The Syndicate (1968 film), based on the Denys Rhodes novel
 The Syndicate: A Death in the Family, a 1970 Italian crime film
 The Syndicate (game show), a British game show on BBC One

Music
 The Syndicate, 1960s Grimbsy-based band formed by Peter "Mars" Cowling, Steve Mills, Frank Singleton, Doug Hollingworth
 The Syndicate, previous name of Wu-Syndicate, Virginia hip hop group
 "The Syndicate", song by Ice-T from Power (Ice-T album)
 "The Syndicate", song by John Lee Hooker from John Lee Hooker Sings the Blues

Other
 The Syndicate (building), a building in St. Louis, Missouri
 Syndicate Blackpool, the largest nightclub in North West England

See also
 Syndicate (disambiguation)